Orfanato Music Group (OMG) is a Puerto Rican record label in the music and performance production industry. OMG was created by William Landron, also known as Don Omar, in 2007. Orfanato Music Group is an independent record label, which represents artists. Its music repertoire is represented nationally and internationally within the Latino marketplace. Its strategy is to serve those interested in Latino music, including reggaeton, Latin hip hop, and bachata, amongst others. The producers and the company were recognized by Billboard.

Artists
 Don Omar
 Natti Natasha
 Kendo Kaponi
 Syco "El Terror" ✟

Produced Albums
 Don Omar Presenta: Meet The Orphans (2010)
 Don Omar Presents MTO²: New Generation (2012)
 Natti Natasha - All About Me EP (2012)

See also
 List of record labels
 Machete Music

References

External links
 https://web.archive.org/web/20110311181008/http://www.orfanatomusicgroup.com/

Don Omar
Puerto Rican record labels
Reggaeton record labels
Hip hop record labels
Record labels established in 2004
Universal Music Latin Entertainment
Puerto Rican brands